Sar Shamir Road railway station is a station on Sar Shamir road, Faisalabad district of Punjab, Pakistan.

See also
 List of railway stations in Pakistan
 Pakistan Railways

References

External links

Railway stations in Faisalabad District
Railway stations on Khanewal–Wazirabad Line